Grimsby School of Art (est. in 1886) is a British art school in North East Lincolnshire, England. It is part of the Grimsby Institute since 2004.

History
Grimsby School of Art's history can be traced back 1886, when an Art Class was established in the town. The students were awarded certificates the South Kensington Department of Science & Art, the forerunner of the Royal College of Art.

The building for the schoold, that got the name of Grimsby College of Art & Design, was designed in 1894 by Herbert Scaping.

The building is now derelict, the Art School becoming the East Coast College of Art and Design, part of the Grimsby Institute since 2004.

Notable staff 
 David Tarttelin,
 Harold Gosney,
 Albert Wade, Principal 1927-53
 Peter Todd was principal for 30 years and taught John Hurt

Notable alumni 
 John Hurt
 Peter Brannon
 Nicholas Volley (1950–2006)
 Robert Dukes (1965-)

References

1886 establishments in the United Kingdom
Educational institutions established in 1886
Educational organisations based in the United Kingdom
Grimsby